Terry is a town in Hinds County, Mississippi, United States. The population was 1,063 at the 2010 census, up from 664 at the 2000 census. The town is part of the Jackson Metropolitan Statistical Area.

History
The town of Terry, originally known as Dry Grove, changed its name in honor of W. D. Terry, whose land the town was built on. This information comes from the bronze plaque in the town's center at Utica and Cunningham streets. The area was established in 1811 by settlers from Virginia. In 1867, the town of Terry was established as a depot when the railroad was built through the area.

For a number of years, Terry was the home of Mississippi governor Albert G. Brown.

Geography
Terry is in southeastern Hinds County and is bordered to the north by the city of Byram. Interstate 55 passes through the west side of the town, with access from Exit 78. I-55 leads north  to Jackson and south  to Crystal Springs.

The town is drained to the east by Rhodes Creek and Vaughn Creek, tributaries of the Pearl River.

Demographics

2020 census

As of the 2020 United States census, there were 1,304 people, 449 households, and 348 families residing in the town.

2010 census
As of the census of 2010, there were 1,063 people, 407 households, and 289 families residing in the town. The population density was 287.4 people per square mile (111.0/km2). There were 288 housing units at an average density of 124.7 per square mile (48.1/km2). The racial makeup of the town was 38.90% White, 59.30% African American, and 0.9% from two or more races. Hispanic or Latino of any race were 0.70% of the population.

There were 407 households, out of which 37.6% had children under the age of 18 living with them, 41.5% were married couples living together, 25.1% had a female householder with no husband present, and 29.0% were non-families. 26.0% of all households were made up of individuals, and 3.2% had someone living alone who was 65 years of age or older. The average household size was 2.61 and the average family size was 3.15.

In the town, the population was spread out, with 31.6% under the age of 18, 5.0% from 18 to 24, 27.6% from 25 to 44, 25.9% from 45 to 64, and 9.9% who were 65 years of age or older. The median age was 34.6 years. For every 100 females there were 79.9 males. For every 100 females age 18 and over, there were 69.2 males.

The median income for a household in the town was $30,192, and the median income for a family was $35,875. Males had a median income of $25,781 versus $24,167 for females. The per capita income for the town was $19,011. About 17.0% of families and 16.2% of the population were below the poverty line, including 19.6% of those under age 18 and 18.5% of those age 65 or over.

Government
Joseph O. Kendrick Jr. was elected mayor of Terry on January 12, 2016, in a special election following the removal of the town's former mayor. The Board of Aldermen consists of Virginia Smith Bailey, Terry Johnson, April Owens Miley, Randy Shepherd, and Connie S. Taylor. Terry Johnson and Connie Taylor are the Democrats on the Board of Aldermen; Mayor Kendrick is also a Democrat. The others were elected as "independents."

Past mayors of Terry include Langston, Keith Davis, H. S. Clark, Rowean McCoy Luper, F. M. "Mike" Yates, Rev. Lester Williams, and William "Billy" Pechloff. Roderick T. Nicholson, the town's first African-American mayor, was elected three times in 2006, 2010 and 2014.

Two Hinds County officials are from the Terry area: Pearlie B. Owens (Justice Court Judge for District Five), and Bennie Buckner (Constable for District Five).

The state senator representing the district including Terry is David Blount of Jackson. Terry is represented by Brad Oberhousen of Terry and Gregory Holloway of Hazlehurst in the state House of Representatives. Due to redistricting, Rep. Credell Calhoun and Gregory Dortch now represent a section near Terry. Sen. Blount, Rep. Holloway, Rep. Oberhausen, and Rep. Calhoun are active Democrats.

In August 2015, Rep. Brad Oberhausen was defeated in the Democratic primary by Jarvis Dortch.

All Hinds County officials and state of Mississippi officials representing the Terry area are Democrats.

Education
Terry is served by the Hinds County School District and is home to Terry High School. In addition to Terry High, residents are zoned to Gary Road Elementary School, Gary Road Intermediate School, and Byram Middle School in Byram.

Past principals of Terry High School include Mr. Bishop, Miss Estelle Scott, Roger McDaniel, Jimmy Russell, Gerald Huskey, Johnny Hines, and Dr. Martin Herrington.

The football field at the high school is named after B. C. Lee.

Jackson/Hinds Library System operates the Ella Bess Austin Library in Terry.

Media
Throughout the twentieth century, the town's weekly newspaper was The Terry Headlight. The Headlight was edited in Terry and printed in Crystal Springs in the office of the Crystal Springs Meteor. Editors of this publication included Mamie Birdsong, Willie Dean Sojourner Brister, Carolyn Booth Patrick, and Elsie Moss Berryhill. Among the columnists were Fanny Dulaney, Dot Champion, and Rev. Ryburn Stancil. The Terry Headlight ceased its publication approximately in 1990.

At the time of the demise of The Terry Headlight, the editor of the Hinds County Gazette (Mary Ann Keith) announced that an insert devoted to the town of Terry would be included in the Gazette. This insert was published for a few weeks, at which time a column about the Terry area was incorporated into the Gazette (as was being included about other towns in Hinds County). The writer of this was Elzena Kitchens Johnson.

In late 2013, The Hinds County Gazette suspended publication. At this time, The Terry Headlight was revived as a weekly online source of information by Elzena Kitchens Johnson.  E-mail subscriptions to this were (and remain) free to readers who request a subscription.

In 2014, The Hinds County Gazette was purchased by The Magnolia Gazette of Pike County.  The weekly Terry column continues in The Hinds County Gazette.

The Terry News was formerly published monthly to provide information about events in Terry and the surrounding area. The newspaper included a monthly column by Mayor Nicholson and was mailed to every household in the 39170 zip code.  The Terry News ceased publishing in early 2015.

Notable people
 Henry L. Brown, physician and World War I veteran
 Bobby DeLaughter, former member of the Mississippi Supreme Court
 Tommy Johnson, Delta blues musician
 Luster Willis, artist

References

External links
Town of Terry official website

Towns in Hinds County, Mississippi
Populated places established in 1811